The Uganda women's national 3x3 team is a national basketball team of Uganda, administered by the Federation of Uganda Basketball Associations ("FUBA").

It represents the country in international 3x3 (3 against 3) women's basketball competitions.

See also
Uganda women's national basketball team

References

Uganda women's national basketball team
Women's national 3x3 basketball teams